Atriolum is a genus of colonial tunicates in the order Enterogona. These are marine animals found attached to the seabed or some other surface.

Species
The World Register of Marine Species lists the following species in the genus:

Atriolum bucinum  Kott, 2001
Atriolum eversum  Kott, 2001
Atriolum glauerti  (Michaelsen, 1930)
Atriolum lilium  Kott, 2001
Atriolum marinense  Kott, 2001
Atriolum marsupialis  Monniot, 1989
Atriolum quadratum  Monniot & Monniot, 1996
Atriolum robustum  Kott, 1983
Atriolum tubiporum  Kott, 2001

References

Enterogona
Tunicate genera